John Daniel Moloney (10 May 1885 – 14 March 1942) was an Australian politician. He was the Labor member for Subiaco in the Western Australian Legislative Assembly from 1933 to 1936.

References

1885 births
1942 deaths
Members of the Western Australian Legislative Assembly
Place of birth missing
Australian Labor Party members of the Parliament of Western Australia